The Methye Portage or Portage La Loche in northwestern Saskatchewan was one of the most important portages in the old fur trade route across Canada. The  portage connected the Mackenzie River basin to rivers that ran east to the Atlantic. It was reached by Peter Pond in 1778 and abandoned in 1883 when steamboats began running on the Athabasca River with links to the railroad. It ranks with Grand Portage as one of the two most important and difficult portages used during the fur trade era.

'Methye' is Cree and 'La Loche' is French for a fish that is called 'burbot' in English. Although 'Methye Portage' is often used the official name since 1957 is Portage La Loche. Both names are used in historical documents, books and journals. Alexander Mackenzie in his book "Voyages from Montreal" used  both Portage la Loche and Mithy-Ouinigam Portage (in 1789–1793).

History

The Methye Portage had been in use by indigenous peoples as a trade route for generations.  They introduced it to Peter Pond in 1778.  Although Anthony Henday had come within sight of the Rocky Mountains in 1754 by overland routes to the south, the advance of western exploration was limited until this fur trade transportation route to the Athabasca opened.   The portage was in constant use until 1883 when the Canadian Pacific Railway reached Calgary ending more than 100 years as the main access to the north.  From the winter of 1822, York boats came into use on this route in addition to canoes.  Furs were transported up the Clearwater River by crews who would bring them to the centre of the portage, where they would be picked up by crews from Norway House for that portion of their transport.

It also allowed for the spread of smallpox to previously untouched indigenous populations, decimating them in a matter of years.

The Methye Portage was also used by Sir Alexander Mackenzie on his exploratory expedition to the west coast, an expedition which reached the Pacific Ocean in 1793, fully 12 years before the more famous Lewis and Clark Expedition.

From 1826 to the early 1870s the Portage La Loche Brigade from Fort Garry arrived at the Portage in July. This famous brigade of York boats would then return via Norway House and York Factory to the Red River Settlement; a  round trip. For a number of years this brigade was under the leadership of Alexis Bonami.

Missionary activity
After the first Oblates opened a mission in Île-à-la-Crosse in 1846  a Catholic priest was usually present when the brigades arrived at the portage. They were well received by the French Métis from the Red River Colony and by the Chipewyan. Father Émile Petitot describes his reception in 1862.

In July 1845 Louis Laferte dit Schmidt, who was born on December 4, 1844 at Old Fort near
Fort Chipewyan, was baptised at Methye Portage by Father Jean-Baptiste Thibault. Another noted baptism at Methye Portage was Francois Beaulieu who was baptised in 1848 by Bishop Alexandre-Antonin Taché.

Route

The trade route began on Lake Winnipeg and ran west up the Saskatchewan River to Cumberland House, Saskatchewan north up the Sturgeon-Weir River, across Frog Portage to the Churchill River, west up the Churchill past the depot on Lac Île-à-la-Crosse, through Peter Pond Lake to Lac La Loche. Here, crews coming from the north and south would exchange their loads. Different boats were used on the two sides of the portage and were rarely carried across it. This section is so steep that sledges, horses and oxen were used. The portage road, which is wide enough for a wagon, is still visible. Having used the portage to reach the Mackenzie River basin, the route went west down the Clearwater River to the modern Fort McMurray and then north down Athabasca River to Fort Chipewyan and beyond.

Staging area

For two weeks every July the south end of the portage was the main staging area for transferring freight from each end of the trail.

In 1862 there were 400 people at the portage according to Father Émile Petitot. There were the two Portage La Loche brigades with 7 boats each and the Athabasca and Mackenzie brigades with 5 boats each. They had 225 men as crew and over 30 passengers.
One canot du nord arrived with a crew of 6-8 Iroquois and two passengers. Dene residents from the surrounding area were camped at the portage in a tipi village of 150 people. The Hudson's Bay Company had 10 employees at the fort who maintained the transportation depots at each end of the portage and brought in horses, oxen and carts for the season.

Petitot wrote "While there were no more than 400 people gathered at the time on the south side of the portage they gave us a little understanding of the confusion of languages at the Tower of Babel. There were people from French Canada, Scotland, Orkney, England, Norway. There were Woodland Cree, Swampy Cree, Chippewa, Chipewyan, Beaver and Métis of all kinds. Grouard and I represented the French." (translation).

Portage trail

Names were given to different locations on the Portage trail by the fur brigades. On the table starting from the south end are some of the names in French and their translation.

These resting places were measured in paces wrote Sir John Richardson in 1848. From the Tail of La Loche to Little Old Man the distance was 2,557 paces. Another 3,171 paces led to Fountain of Sand and so on. The total number of paces from the Tail of La Loche to The Meadow is 24,593 or 1,294 paces per kilometre.
Most of these resting places on the Portage have not yet been identified. Under ideal conditions  is walked at an easy pace in about 4 hours.

Cemetery
Along the Portage Trail there were marked graves from the fur trade era according to the following Oblate account written in 1933 by Father Louis Moraud.

National historic site

The Methye Portage was designated a National Historic Site in 1933 and the Clearwater River was designated a Canadian Heritage River in 1986. Today the Methye Portage and the Saskatchewan portion of the Clearwater River are within the Clearwater River Provincial Park.

A bronze plaque is set in a stone cairn at the entrance to the portage. The dedication is written in French and English. The English version is quoted:

See also
Canadian canoe routes
Continental Divide

References

Eric W. Morse, "Fur Trade Canoe Routes of Canada, Then and Now",1984

External links

South end of Portage 
Rendezvous Lake near centre of Methye Portage 
North end of Portage 
Encyclopedia of Saskatchewan

Portages in Canada
Hudson's Bay Company trading posts
Historic trails and roads in Saskatchewan